Russell House in Pine Bluff, Arkansas was built in 1912.

It was listed on the National Register of Historic Places in 1982.

It was delisted from the National Register in 2006.

References

1912 establishments in Arkansas
Houses completed in 1912
Houses in Pine Bluff, Arkansas
Houses on the National Register of Historic Places in Arkansas
National Register of Historic Places in Pine Bluff, Arkansas
Former National Register of Historic Places in Arkansas